Mompha murtfeldtella is a moth in the family Momphidae. It is found in North America, where it has been recorded from Alabama, 
California, Florida, Illinois, Indiana, Kansas, Kentucky, Maine, Maryland, Minnesota, Mississippi, North Carolina, Ohio, Oklahoma, Tennessee, Texas and Wisconsin.

Adults are similar to Mompha circumscriptella, but the white patch on the posterior margin of the basal half of the forewing is much less extensive and the forewing ground color is less uniform. It consists of mottled greyish brown, rust and white, with small dashes of black.

The larvae feed on the reproductive tissue of Oenothera species.

References

Moths described in 1875
Momphidae
Moths of North America